Goldsmiths is a luxury jewellery retailer based in the United Kingdom. Established in 1778, the company operates over 120 showrooms across Great Britain and Northern Ireland.

History 
Goldsmiths is a jewellery business with over 230 years of tradition and experience, in that time growing to become one of the largest jewellers in the UK. Their first showroom, located in Newcastle, opened in 1778 and is still trading today on the same site. The business has over 120 showrooms nationwide and a trading website.

There have been many notable achievements for Goldsmiths, which include being the UK’s first appointed stockist of Rolex watches. Today, it operates the largest distribution network for Rolex as well as Cartier, Omega, TAG Heuer, Gucci and many other reputable prestige and fashion watch brands.

Sport 
Goldsmiths are a sponsor of the Leicester Tigers Rugby Football Club, sponsoring a stand within the Welford Road stadium and the club's Player of the Month Award.

References

External links 
 Goldsmiths

Companies based in Leicester
Companies formerly listed on the London Stock Exchange
Retail companies established in 1778
Companies based in Newcastle upon Tyne
Jewellery retailers of the United Kingdom

 CharlesFish